Ingamay Bylund (born 25 September 1947) is a Swedish equestrian and Olympic medalist. She was born in Söderhamn. She won a bronze medal in dressage at the 1984 Summer Olympics in Los Angeles.

References

External links

1947 births
Living people
People from Söderhamn Municipality
Swedish female equestrians
Swedish dressage riders
Olympic equestrians of Sweden
Olympic bronze medalists for Sweden
Equestrians at the 1984 Summer Olympics
Olympic medalists in equestrian
Medalists at the 1984 Summer Olympics
Sportspeople from Gävleborg County
20th-century Swedish people
21st-century Swedish people